Silke Günther (born 29 December 1976 in East Berlin, East Germany) is a German rower.

References 

 
 

1976 births
Living people
German female rowers
Rowers from Berlin
Olympic rowers of Germany
Rowers at the 2004 Summer Olympics
Rowers at the 2008 Summer Olympics
World Rowing Championships medalists for Germany
European Rowing Championships medalists
20th-century German women
21st-century German women